Castleinch or Inchyolaghan is a civil parish and townland in County Kilkenny, Ireland.

References

Civil parishes of County Kilkenny
Townlands of County Kilkenny
Church of Ireland parishes in the Republic of Ireland